Bhavisha M "Bhavi" Devchand (born 24 December 1992) is an Australian cricketer, coach and podcaster. An all-rounder, she bats right-handed and bowls right-arm leg spin. In 2020–21, she played for Victoria in the Women's National Cricket League (WNCL) and was a member of the Melbourne Stars squad for the Women's Big Bash League (WBBL), but did not play any matches for the Stars. Previously, she played for Western Australia, Gloucestershire, and Perth Scorchers. She also played for Irish team Scorchers in 2019, and has returned to play for them in 2022.

References

External links

Bhavisha Devchand at Cricket Australia
The Inside Edge podcast, with Bhavi Devchand

1992 births
Living people
Cricketers from Mutare
Australian women cricketers
Gloucestershire women cricketers
Melbourne Stars (WBBL) cricketers
Perth Scorchers (WBBL) cricketers
Victoria women cricketers
Western Australia women cricketers
Scorchers (women's cricket) cricketers